The Iraqi National List was a coalition of Iraqi political parties who ran in the December 2005 Iraqi elections and got 8.0% of the vote and 25 out of 275 seats.

History
Prior to the December election the Iraqi list merged with Ghazi al-Yawer's The Iraqis, the most successful Sunni party in the January elections, and the Communist People's Union. The Iraqi National List alliance was created to offer a secular, cross-community alternative - composed of both Sunnis and Shiites - to the religious Shiite United Iraqi Alliance and the Sunni Iraqi Accord Front.

Member parties
Iraqi Communist Party
Assembly of Independent Democrats
People's Union
Al-Qasimy Democratic Assembly
Iraqi Republican Group
Arab Socialist Movement
Independent Democratic Gathering
Iraqi National Accord
League of Iraqi Turkmen Lords and Tribes led by Abd Al-Hammed Al-Bayati
Alfurat Al Awsat Assemblage
The Iraqis
Loyalty For Iraq Coalition
Independent Iraqi Alliance
Independent Iraqi Sheikhs Council
The National List
Al-Ahrar

December 2005 election results
The coalition ended up with 977,325 votes, or 8.0% of the vote, which amounted to 25 out of 275 seats in the Iraqi National Assembly. The following 25 people were nominated as the coalition's representatives:

1. Usama Abd Al Azeez Al Nujaifi - Sunni Arab
2. Iyad Allawi - Shiite Arab, Iraqi National Accord
3. Iyad Raouf Mohamed Jalal Al Deen
4. Jamal Abd Al Hadi Batekh
5. Hajem Mahdi Saleh
6. Husam Abd Al Kareem Abed Ali
7. Husain Ali Al Sha'alan
8. Hamid Majid Mousa - Shiite, Iraqi Communist Party
9. Kheir Alla Kareem Kathem
10. Radwan Husain Abbas Al Kleidar
11. Sa'ad Sfouk Al Masoudi
12. Safia Taleb Ali
13. Aida Shareef Tawfeeq
14. Alia Naseef Jasem
15. Abd Al Lateef Abd Al Wahab Husain
16. Adnan Pachachi - Sunni Arab, Assembly of Independent Democrats
17. Ezzat Hasan Ali
18. Ghazi al-Yawar - Sunni Arab, The Iraqis
19. Falah Hassan al-Naqib
20. Mohamed Tawfeeq Husain
21. Mohamed Abbas Mohamed
22. Mofeed Mohaed Jawad
23. Mahdi Ahmad Al Hafeth
24. Maysun al-Damluji
25. Wael Abdul Latif

References

Defunct political party alliances in Iraq
Electoral lists for Iraqi elections